Temane Thermal Power Station, is a  natural gas power plant under construction in Mozambique. When completed, the energy generated will be purchased by Electricidade de Moçambique (EDM), the government-owned electric utility company, under a long-term power purchase agreement.

Location
The power station is located in the town of Temane, in Inhambane Province in southern Mozambique.

Developers
The power station is under development by a consortium comprising the corporate entities illustrated in the table below:

History
This power project was originally owned by EDM of Mozambique and Sasol New Energy Holdings of South Africa. In December 2020, the owner/developers brought on Globeleq and eleQtra. The consortium jointly formed a special purpose vehicle company to develop this power station, which they named Temane Energy Consortium (TEC). Financial closure was achieved in December 2020. The power station will be designed and constructed by TSK Electronica y Electricidad S.A. (TSK Group), a Spanish electronic and electricity construction company.

Funding
The table below illustrates the funding sources for the Temane Thermal Power Station. The list of funders may not be complete.

Associated developments
In addition to the natural gas-powered electricity generating plant, as part of the same development,  of associated transmission infrastructure will be established to distribute the energy generated to neighboring communities and where possible sell any excess to the Southern Africa Power Pool.

It is expected that when this power station comes online in 2022, a portion of the energy generated  here, amounting to 100 megawatts, will be sold to Botswana Power Corporation (BPC), under a one-year power purchase agreement signed in April 2022, between EDM and BPC, in Gaborone, Botswana.

See also

List of power stations in Mozambique

References

External links
 TSK to supply a new flexible power plant in Mozambique As of 16 December 2020.

Natural gas-fired power stations in Mozambique
Inhambane Province
Energy infrastructure in Mozambique